Exotic Point is a point on the southwest side of Fildes Peninsula, King George Island, forming the south entrance point to Geographers Cove. The approved name is a translation of the Russian "Mys Ekzoticheskiy" applied by Soviet Antarctic Expedition geologists in 1968. The name presumably refers to the different nature of the rocks from those adjoining the point.

References 

Headlands of Antarctica